Pheidole xerophila is a species of ant and a higher myrmicine in the family Formicidae.

Like many other species in the genus Pheidole, the ants are dimorphic; colonies contain two castes of workers, "minor" and much larger "major" workers.

References

Further reading

External links

 

xerophila
Articles created by Qbugbot
Insects described in 1908